Henderson is a city in and the county seat of Chester County, Tennessee, United States. The population was 6,309 at the 2010 census, up from 5,670 at the 2000 census.

History
Henderson was platted in 1857, when the railroad was extended to that point. The city takes its name from Henderson County, Tennessee. Henderson was called Dayton during the Civil War, then was known as Henderson Station and, finally, Henderson.

Geography
Henderson is located near the center of Chester County at  (35.443025, -88.644345), to the west of the South Fork Forked Deer River. U.S. Route 45 passes through the city, leading northwest  to Jackson and south  to Selmer. Tennessee State Route 100 passes south of the city center, leading east  to Decaturville and west  to Whiteville.

Arts, culture and outdoors
For several years, the Henderson Arts Commission has sponsored many arts-related events and programs, like the Summer Camp Theatre Experience.

The city park is called Gene Record Park. It features playground equipment, a walking trail, soccer fields, a permanent space for the local Farmer's Market, picnic tables, a dog park, and a 9-hole disc golf course. In January 2020, the city paper (Chester County Independent) reported that a Splash Pad would soon be installed at the park.

Since 1978, Henderson has also been the site of the Chester County Barbecue Festival, a regional event that celebrates the barbecue tradition of the area. The first pitmaster for the Chester County Barbecue Festival was Bill Howard, a pitmaster from Jacks Creek, Tennessee who was known throughout Chester County as "The Barbecue King". Howard was chosen by the Smithsonian Folklife Festival to represent Afro-American barbecue and was invited to serve barbecue in Washington, DC in 1986.

Newspaper
The local paper, the Chester County Independent, is based in Henderson.

Demographics

2020 census

As of the 2020 United States census, there were 6,308 people, 1,992 households, and 1,261 families residing in the city.

2000 census
As of the census of 2000, there were 5,670 people, 1,896 households, and 1,270 families residing in the city. The population density was 991.6 people per square mile (382.7/km2). There were 2,072 housing units at an average density of 362.4 per square mile (139.9/km2). The racial makeup of the city was 80.09% White, 17.87% African American, 0.09% Native American, 0.41% Asian, 0.37% from other races, and 1.18% from two or more races. Hispanic or Latino of any race were 1.52% of the population.

There were 1,896 households, out of which 31.8% had children under the age of 18 living with them, 47.0% were married couples living together, 16.6% had a female householder with no husband present, and 33.0% were non-families. 28.7% of all households were made up of individuals, and 14.3% had someone living alone who was 65 years of age or older. The average household size was 2.41 and the average family size was 2.96.

In the city, the population was spread out, with 21.5% under the age of 18, 25.2% from 18 to 24, 22.5% from 25 to 44, 16.0% from 45 to 64, and 14.8% who were 65 years of age or older. The median age was 27 years. For every 100 females, there were 85.4 males. For every 100 females age 18 and over, there were 80.0 males.

The median income for a household in the city was $32,648, and the median income for a family was $40,907. Males had a median income of $32,215 versus $22,258 for females. The per capita income for the city was $16,735. About 15.4% of families and 19.0% of the population were below the poverty line, including 27.6% of those under age 18 and 20.1% of those age 65 or over.

Education 

Henderson is part of the Chester County School District and home to Chester County High School. It is also the home of Freed-Hardeman University.

Notable people
Eddy Arnold, country musician, born in Henderson in 1918.
Jack Dalton, Major League Baseball player, born in Henderson in 1885.
Dorsey B. Hardeman, Texas politician, born in Henderson in 1902.
Robby Novak, actor who plays Kid President, born in Henderson in 2004.
Walton Bryan Stewart, Wisconsin politician, born in Henderson in 1914.
Sue Shelton White, national feminist leader and suffragist lawyer, born in Henderson in 1887.

References

External links

City of Henderson official website
Henderson/Chester County Chamber of Commerce
A Brief History of Chester County

Cities in Tennessee
Cities in Chester County, Tennessee
County seats in Tennessee
Jackson metropolitan area, Tennessee